Rawd al-Jinan wa Ruh al-Janan (The Cool Breeze of Paradise and [God's] Breath for the Soul) also known as Tafsīr Abū al- Futūḥ is an exegesis on the Quran written by Abu l-Futuh al-Razi in the 6th A.H./12th century. The book, consisting of twenty volumes, is the earliest surviving Persian tafsīr with an Imāmī Shīʿī emphasis. It delves into mystical themes regularly.

Early reception
Abū al-Futūḥ's work was well received and widely distributed, according to al-Qazwīnī al-Rāzī: "There are numerous, indeed countless, copies of it circulating among Muslims in all parts of the globe" and "authorities and scholars from all the different groups seek it out and desire it". Abū al-Futūḥ also stated the introduction that he wrote this Persian tafsir due to the numerous requests from people.

Exegetical approach
The book's exegetical technique is to provide a translation of a Qurʾānic paragraph, followed by the disputes(khilāf) around the meaning and status, abrogated or otherwise, of the verse. It then relates the various positions to the earliest Arabic Qurʾānic commentators. The author describes tafsir and hence his approach as “knowledge of the reasons for the revelation of a verse, and knowledge of what God means by that expression”. He gives no indication that using Persian to carry out this exercise might raise any hermeneutic issues. The author sees language as a neutral tool through which meanings can be expressed without deformity. It follows al-Tusi's approach of combining discourses of a literary nature, based on sayings transmitted by the traditional sources, with speculative and intellectual argument.

Rawḍ al-jinān is an exhortatory commentary. The author allocated a large portion of his work to the explanation of juristic rulings, knowledge of which was required by his readers. 

The fact that he dwells less on theological problems—and when he does, he only touches upon such issues as jabr wa ikhtiyār (free will and determination), qaḍāʾ wa qadar (predestination and destiny), sins, intercession, faith and unbelief, reward and punishment, the questions posed by the angels in the grave and the appropriate answers (see Ḥuqūqī, 1/235–236)—is possibly due to his sensitivity to the requirements and preferences of the majority of his Persian-speaking readers.

Recognition of Sunni Tafsirs
This commentary reflects the views and opinions of Sunni scholars on Qurʾānic exegesis. In this manner it is different from early (4th-10th century) Shiʿi commentaries as those by Ali Ibn Ibrahim Qomi and Muḥammad b. Masʿūd Abū Naṣr al-ʿAyyāshī. Furthermore, in the case of those verses that contain legal rulings, he insists on invoking the legal opinions of Sunni jurists. Nevertheless, when appropriate, he mentions the jurisprudential differences between them and the Shiʿa, and, in regard to theological subjects, defends the Shiʿi stance.

Impact on later tafsir works
Some tafsir works such as Jilāʾ al-adhhān wa jalāʾ al-aḥzān, better known as Tafsir Gazur, is clearly influenced by Rawd al-jinan such that it is sometimes viewed as a summary of the Rawḍ al-jinān even though the author Maḥāsin Ḥusayn b. Ḥasan al-Jurjānī (q.v.), never refers to Rawḍ al-jinān or even mentions that his commentary is in fact a synopsis of it. Molla Fathollah Kashani, the theologian and jurisprudent of the 10th-16th century, based his own commentary, Menhaj Al-Sadeghin, on Jilāʾ al-adhhān, and so presents Rawḍ al-jinān in a new form. It would seem that for al-Kāshānī the Jilāʾ al-adhhān and Rawḍ al-jinān were essentially one and the same.

References

Shia tafsir